Malipura is a locality in Khair City of Aligarh district in the Indian state of Uttar Pradesh. It is situated on Tentigaon Road and Tentigaon Bypass Road.

Demographics
As of 2011 India census, Malipura had a population of 7,565. Males constitute 52% of the population and females 48%. Malipura has an average literacy rate of 52%, lower than the national average of 59.5%: male literacy is 58%, and female literacy is 42%. In Malipura, 20% of the population is under 6 years of age.

See also  
 Khair City, Uttar Pradesh
List of cities in Uttar Pradesh

References

Cities and towns in Aligarh district